Alina Baraz (born September 24, 1993) is an American singer from Cleveland, Ohio. In 2015, Baraz and electronic producer Galimatias released a collaborative EP together titled Urban Flora through Ultra Music after discovering each other's work online. The EP was met with positive reception and streaming success. Baraz released her first solo EP, The Color of You, in 2018. In April 2020, Baraz released her debut studio album, It Was Divine.

Early life 
Alina Baraz was born on September 24, 1993, in Cleveland, Ohio, to Russian-Ukrainian parents. She was the first child in her family born in United States. Growing up, her parents raised her on classical music, and on her own, she became interested in '90s music and singers such as Adele, Amy Winehouse and Corinne Bailey Rae. She began singing at a young age in her gospel choir. At age 19, she decided to move to Los Angeles, California to pursue singing as a professional career. She developed a passion for songwriting and wrote her first song, titled "Roses Dipped in Gold", released on April 15, 2013, in the "Lounge Masters Vibes" collection series.

Career

2013–2016: Urban Flora
After moving to Los Angeles, Baraz discovered Danish electronic producer Galimatias' music online. She wrote lyrics for one of his instrumentals and released it on SoundCloud as a song titled "Drift" in 2013. Galimatias heard the track and decided to create more music with her. The two created an EP titled Urban Flora by sending each other music through Facebook and did not meet in person until February 2015, when the project was already finished. Alongside "Drift", the songs "Pretty Thoughts", "Make You Feel" and "Fantasy" were released individually preceding Urban Flora. The EP was originally released on SoundCloud but on May 19, 2015, it received a commercial digital release through Ultra Music. Upon release Urban Flora was met with positive critical reception and it peaked at number 111 on the US Billboard 200 and number 2 on the US Billboard Top Dance/Electronic Albums Chart. On September 9, 2015, a remix EP for Urban Flora was released, and later that month Baraz and Galimatias embarked on a brief co-headlining North American concert tour in support of the EP. In August 2016, Baraz signed a record deal with independent label Mom + Pop Music and released a vinyl edition of Urban Flora.

2016–2020: The Color of You and It Was Divine
In the spring and summer of 2016, Baraz made her first solo live appearances by performing at North American music festivals such as Lightning in a Bottle, Sasquatch! Music Festival, Electric Forest Festival and Lollapalooza. Also in the summer of 2016, Baraz shared that she was working on her debut solo studio album. Baraz's first solo single, "Electric," featuring R&B singer Khalid, was released on January 20, 2017 through Mom + Pop Music, the single later appeared on her second EP, The Color of You, in 2018. Following the release of the single, Baraz announced her first solo concert tour, entitled the 'Let's Get Lost Tour'. The tour took place from March to April 2017 and visited various cities across the United States and Canada.

In September and October 2017, Baraz supported British rock band Coldplay for the final 8 North American shows on their A Head Full of Dreams Tour. On September 29, 2017, Baraz released two singles, titled "Lavender and Velvet" and "Buzzin," in anticipation of her upcoming debut studio album. "Buzzin" peaked at number 10 on the US Billboard Dance/Electronic Digital Songs Chart and the music video for the song, Baraz's first music video, was released exclusively through Apple Music on December 22, 2017. It was announced that Baraz will be part of the Coachella 2018 lineup.

On April 6, 2018, Baraz released her first solo EP, The Color of You, and released a music video for the track "I Don't Even Know Why Though".

In September 2019 Baraz released the single "To Me". In January 2020, Baraz released the standalone single "Trust", which was followed by the singles "Morocco" and "More Than Enough" in February and March respectively.

In March 2020, Baraz announced the release her debut studio album, It Was Divine, which was released on April 24, 2020. The album was supported by the singles "To Me", "Morocco" featuring 6lack, "More Than Enough" and "Off The Grid" featuring Khalid. It Was Divine features guest appearances from Nas and Smino and charted at #43 on the Billboard 200.

2021–present: Independent music and touring 

On July 23, 2021, Alina Baraz released the single "Alone With You". The song would mark her first release as an independent artist, following her departure from her previous record label, Mom+Pop. Alongside the song's release, Baraz announced a tour of the same name, set to start in late 2021. On September 24, Baraz released the EP Sunbeam. The EP serves as part one of a two-part EP series. The second EP, Moongate, was released on October 29, 2021.

Tours 
Headlining
 Urban Flora Tour (with Galimatias) (2015)
 Let's Get Lost Tour (2017)
 Alina Baraz: The Tour (2018)
 Alone With You Tour (2021)

Supporting
 Coldplay – A Head Full of Dreams Tour (2017)

Discography

Albums

Extended plays

Singles

Guest appearances

Promotional singles

References 

1993 births
21st-century American women singers
American women singer-songwriters
American people of Russian descent
American people of Ukrainian descent
Living people
Singer-songwriters from Ohio
Musicians from Cleveland
Ultra Records artists
American contemporary R&B singers
Downtempo musicians
Electronica musicians
Mom + Pop Music artists